John Edward Berne (born 14 March 1954) is a rugby union and rugby league player who represented Australia in rugby union. Berne, a centre, claimed one international rugby cap for Australia.

Biography 
Berne was born on 14 March 1954 in Anderstown, Belfast, County Antrim, Northern Ireland to Gerald and Mary Berne. He has four brothers. In 1961, his family relocated to Australia. Berne attended school at Marist Brothers, Pagewood, where he was introduced to the Rugby League. Throughout middle school, he represented both the Marist midweek and South Sydney in the Under 15 Years S G Ball Competition. He then went on to play for MBP as a senior in school.

In 1972, when he was 18-years old, he presented himself to the Randwick Club, but was advised to spend a year with the Colts due to his lack of experience. Instead, he went back to join the South Sydney Jersey Flegg Team. He also played some Third Grade matches for the Souths as an amateur rugby player.

Personal life 
In 1978, Berne married Anne Hickman. Anne is the grand-niece of the legendary Rugby League Test centre Dave Brown. The couple have two sons, and one daughter. Both sons have played First Grade with Randwick.

References

1954 births
Living people
Australian rugby league players
Australian rugby union players
Australia international rugby union players
Cronulla-Sutherland Sharks players
Rugby league players from County Antrim
Rugby union players from County Antrim
South Sydney Rabbitohs players
Sydney Roosters players
Rugby union centres